Myrdal is an area in Aurland, Norway. Its only built-out facilities is Myrdal Station on the Bergen Line and the Flåm Line. There is a small station village surrounding the station.

Aurland
Villages in Vestland